An ice cube is a chunk of frozen water in the shape of a cube.

Ice Cube is an American rapper, actor and filmmaker.

Ice cube may also refer to:

 Ice Cube Curling Center, the curling venue at the 2014 Winter Olympics in Sochi, Russia
 Ice Cubed, Inter-Client Communication Conventions Manual
 Gerald McNeil, an American football player nicknamed "The Ice Cube"
 Beijing National Aquatics Center, the aquatics—turned curling venue is also known as the "Ice Cube", located in Beijing, China
Science
 IceCube Neutrino Observatory, an observatory in Antarctica
IceCube (spacecraft), a satellite
 Lunar IceCube, a planned nanosatellite mission

See also
 Ice (disambiguation)
 ICE 3, high speed train
 Ice III, form of solid water
 Ice Ic, cubic crystalline ice, form of solid water